Dancing with the dead (comic thriller in two acts) is a 2005 play by Georgian playwright Miho Mosulishvili.

Plot synopsis
On background permanently proceeding war in the Caucasus, near border mountains is situated hotel 'Dreamland of Mountains'. This hotel bought two married couple: Boa (wife) and Davy (husband); Lily (wife) and Tattoo (husband).

The trouble begins when it will appear that their partner in sales of heroin of Siko-torpedo (this character we don't see in the play) brought a gift a suitcase in which owe a life two million dollar, but five hundred thousand dollars doesn't suffice that at the local prices makes cost thousand heroin grams.

Boa (wife) compels to the husband, Davy that it too took a stick of golf in hands and let it too will go to kill other couple.

In that too time, Tattoo (husband) compels to the wife, Lily that it too took a stick of golf in hands and let it too went to kill other couples.

When lagged behind the live Lily (the widow of Tattoo) and Devy (widower Boa) from hotel take out corpses, shoes of the killed spouses start knocking on a ladder and Poured and Tattoo start dancing with corpses on a back (The play name from here turns out).

Owner who will provide proofs comes that accident was is arranged is artificial and he back returned already the money, but only for this purpose doesn't kill Lily and Davy that newlyweds have to liquidate Siko-torpedo.

Both are more dead, Boa and Tattoo are already in heavens where they the teacher of golf have William Shakespeare, and in Solfeggio they are engaged under the direction of the inventor of music notes Guido of Arezzo.

Owner who supervised and ruled all these events, is sure that he created more successful play, than his friend William Shakespeare.

Characters
 Davy — a husband, flicks his braces
 Boa — a wife, stamps on the tips of her toes
 Tattoo — the other husband, clinks his beads
 Lily — the other wife, her beads resembling silver coins chink
 Owner — a general of the Military Forces Department, walks noiselessly

Production
 May 12, 2008 — Georgian radio FM 102,4, Director Zurab Kandelaki

Publication
 December 4, 2014 — FeedARead.com Publishing, Total Pages: 167.

References
Notes

External links
 Dancing with the dead
 Almost Picasso and on a few Bosch, on the right side

2005 plays
Plays based on real people
Works by Miho Mosulishvili